Hikatarewa Rockcliffe "Hika" Reid (born 8 April 1958) is a former New Zealand rugby union player. A hooker, Reid represented Bay of Plenty and Wellington at a provincial level, and was a member of the New Zealand national side, the All Blacks, between 1980 and 1986. He played 40 matches for the All Blacks including nine internationals. He is remembered today for a spectacular try in the second test against Australia in Brisbane, 1980, in which he started and ended a counterattack from near the All Blacks' goal line.

References

1958 births
Living people
Rugby union players from Rotorua
People educated at Western Heights High School
New Zealand rugby union players
New Zealand international rugby union players
Bay of Plenty rugby union players
Wellington rugby union players
Māori All Blacks players
Rugby union hookers
People from Ngongotaha